The Bourse du Travail is a 1,950-capacity theatre located in Lyon, France. Built in 1929, it was designated a monument historique in 1989. Some of the artists that performed at the venue include Asia, Mötley Crüe, Blue Öyster Cult, Iggy Pop and Metallica.

References

Theatres in Lyon